Shotwellia is a genus of band-winged grasshoppers in the family Acrididae. There is one described species in Shotwellia, S. isleta.

References

Further reading

 
 

Oedipodinae
Articles created by Qbugbot